Wombwell Central railway station was a railway station situated on the South Yorkshire Railway company's line between Mexborough and Barnsley. The station lay between Wath Central and Stairfoot. The station was built to serve the mining town of Wombwell, near Barnsley, South Yorkshire, England and is situated on its northern edge.

History
The original Wombwell railway station was opened by the South Yorkshire Railway in September 1851 and was replaced by a new structure in the Manchester, Sheffield and Lincolnshire Railway's "Double Pavilion" style in the 1880s. It was closed when the Doncaster-to-Barnsley local passenger service was withdrawn on 29 June 1959.

Accidents and incidents
On 13 December 1911 a freight train ran away and was derailed at the station. Both locomotive crew were killed.

References

External links
 Wombwell Central station on navigable 1947 O. S. map

Disused railway stations in Barnsley
Railway stations in Great Britain opened in 1851
Railway stations in Great Britain closed in 1959
1851 establishments in England
Former South Yorkshire Railway stations